Acrocercops argodesma is a moth of the family Gracillariidae, known from Java, Indonesia. The hostplant for the species is Eugenia cumini.

References

argodesma
Moths of Asia
Moths described in 1936